The Macau Federation of Trade Unions (MFTU) is a pro-Beijing labour and political group in Macau. It is the largest and most influential labour group in the city, with over 50,000 members in 43 associated trade unions. Presided by Ho Sut Heng and chaired by Lee Chong Cheng, it currently holds four seats in the Legislative Assembly.

History 
The MFTU and a few other pro-Beijing organisations formed an electoral alliance named the "Union for Development" in the run-up to the 1992 legislative and municipal elections.

The MFTU is one of the three major pro-Beijing organisations which have dominated politics in Macau since the 1999 handover, the other two being the Macau Chinese Chamber of Commerce and the General Union of Neighbourhood Associations of Macau.

Four members of the MFTU were elected to the Legislative Assembly in the 2021 legislative election. They were Lam Lon Wai, Lei Chan U, Ella Lei Cheng I, and Leong Sun Iok.

Gallery

See also 
 Hong Kong Federation of Trade Unions, equivalent organisation in Hong Kong

Notes

References 

Political parties in Macau
Trade unions in China